Sabir Khan (born 24 November 2000) is an Indian cricketer. He made his List A debut for Bihar in the 2018–19 Vijay Hazare Trophy on 14 October 2018. He made his first-class debut on 9 December 2019, for Bihar in the 2019–20 Ranji Trophy.

References

External links
 

2000 births
Living people
Indian cricketers
Bihar cricketers
Place of birth missing (living people)